Love Pier is a light rail station of the Circular Line of the Kaohsiung rapid transit system. It is located in Yancheng District, Kaohsiung, Taiwan.

Station overview
The station is an elevated station with two side platforms. It is located at the junction of Bijhong Road and Gongyuan 2nd Road, beside Love Pier.

Station layout

Around the Station
 Love Pier
 Kaohsiung Music Center
 Lingyaliao Iron Bridge
 Shigang Riverside Park
 Dayi Park
 Kaohsiung Harbor Piers 11 and 12

References

2015 establishments in Taiwan
Railway stations opened in 2015
Circular light rail stations